is a Japanese weekly women's magazine, which has been in circulation since 1958. Published by Kobunsha, it is the first weekly women's magazine in Japan, which targets single-working women.

History and profile
Josei Jishin was established in 1958, and the first issue was published on 2 December 1958. The founding company is Kobunsha. The magazine is published on a weekly basis. It developed a collaboration with American youth magazine Seventeen and published its photographs during the initial years. In 1999 due to its fortieth anniversary the magazine was redesigned, including its logo.

The magazine is the recipient of Fuji Sankei award for four times.

Circulation
Josei Jishin sold 705,399 copies in the second half of 1979. In 2006 the circulation of the magazine was 519,464 copies. Its circulation was 255,089 copies in 2010 and 243,568 in 2011.

Legal issues
In October 2007, J-pop duo Pink Lady sued Kobunsha for 3.7 million after Josei Jishin used photos of the duo on an article on dieting through dancing without their permission. The case was rejected by the Tokyo District Court. In February 2012, the Supreme Court rejected the duo's appeal based on the right of publicity.

References

External links

1958 establishments in Japan
Kobunsha
Magazines established in 1958
Magazines published in Tokyo
Weekly magazines published in Japan
Women's magazines published in Japan